Apa Roșie River may refer to:

 Apa Roșie, another name for the upper course of the Bărzăuța in Covasna County
 Apa Roșie, a tributary of the Ozunca in Covasna County